The 2012 Charleston Battery season was the club's twentieth season of existence. It is the Battery's third consecutive year in the third tier of American soccer, playing in the USL Professional Division for their second season.

Background 

The Charleston Battery are coming off their inaugural year of playing in the USL Professional Division, the highest division of soccer under the United Soccer Leagues umbrella, and the third division in the American soccer pyramid. The Battery, finished fourth in the American Division of USL Pro, and had the fifth best overall record in the league. In the USL Pro Playoffs, the Battery lost to the eventual champions, Orlando City in extra time.

Competitions

Carolina Challenge Cup

USL Pro

Standings

USL Pro Playoffs

U.S. Open Cup

Statistics

Appearances and goals 

|}

Transfers

Players in

Players out

See also 
 2012 in American soccer
 2012 USL Pro season
 Charleston Battery

References 

2012 USL Pro season
Charleston Battery seasons
American soccer clubs 2012 season
2012 in sports in South Carolina